The 1935 NCAA Wrestling Championships were the 8th NCAA Wrestling Championships to be held. Lehigh in Bethlehem, Pennsylvania hosted the tournament at Taylor Gymnasium.

Oklahoma A&M took home the team championship with 36 points and three individual champions.

Ross Flood of Oklahoma A&M was named the Outstanding Wrestler.

Team results

Individual finals

References

NCAA Division I Wrestling Championship
Wrestling competitions in the United States
1935 in American sports
1935 in sports in Pennsylvania